The Vamos con Vos (VcV) is an Argentine political coalition founded in 2021 that competed in the legislative election in the provinces of Buenos Aires, Chaco, Corrientes, La Pampa y Santiago del Estero.

In the province of Buenos Aires, it was made up of the following parties: Frente H.A.C.E.R. for Social Progress, Third Position Party and Freemen of the South Movement. In Chaco and Corrientes, the coalition was made up of Freemen of the South and the Socialist Party.

National deputies 
The three national deputies are part of the Identidad Bonaerense block, which in turn is part of the Federal Consensus Interblock.

Constituent parties in the 2021 elections

References

See also 

 Peronism
 Federal Peronism
 Federal Consensus 
Political parties established in 2021
Peronism
2021 establishments in Argentina